Samurai Shodown IV: Amakusa's Revenge is the fourth in SNK's flagship Samurai Shodown series of fighting games. Chronologically, it is the second and final chapter of a story between Samurai Shodown and Samurai Shodown II, with Samurai Shodown III being the first chapter. Samurai Shodown! on the Neo Geo Pocket is a monochrome adaptation of this game, and it was followed by Samurai Shodown! 2 on the Neo Geo Pocket Color, which is a 2D adaptation of Samurai Shodown 64: Warriors Rage.

Gameplay

Among other series changes, aerial blocking was removed entirely. One can also no longer charge one's own "pow" gauge. The off-screen delivery man was omitted entirely from the game. The "CD combo" was added, wherein a player can press the C and D buttons together, triggering a strike that can be followed up by a sequence of button taps.

SNK also added a "suicide" move, wherein one's character forfeits the round. The bonus to this is that the one committing suicide will start the next round with a full "POW" gauge. Certain finishes also enable a "fatality" move in the vein of Mortal Kombat.

Characters
Some of the older characters were restored, such as Charlotte, Tam Tam and Jubei Yagyu. The entire cast of the previous game also returns, though some have been retouched to further enhance the cartoonish look.

Joining the cast are the two ninja brothers:

Kazuki Kazama - member of the Kazama ninja clan specializing in fire jutsu, he deserts to rescue his younger sister, Hazuki, from Amakusa's clutches.
Sogetsu Kazama - older brother to Kazuki and Hazuki who uses water jutsu; unlike Kazuki, he stays with the clan and is ordered to assassinate his brother for leaving.

Cham Cham from Samurai Shodown II also makes a playable appearance, exclusively for the PlayStation port of the game known in Japan as Samurai Spirits: Amakusa's Descent Special.

Reception
In Japan, Game Machine listed Samurai Shodown IV on their December 1, 1996 issue as being the most-popular arcade game at the time. According to Famitsu, the AES version sold over 9,253 copies in its first week on the market.

Reviewing the arcade version in GamePro, The Union Buster commented that Samurai Shodown IV lacks the depth of contemporaries such as Street Fighter Alpha 2 and Soul Edge, but for the same reason offers an easier pick-up-and-play experience. He was unimpressed with the two new characters but pleased with the return of those which had been dropped from the roster in Samurai Shodown III. He particularly praised the visuals, remarking that "The fighters have superb animation; several fighting stages are outright beautiful; and the special moves look awesome."

The four reviewers of Electronic Gaming Monthly gave the Neo Geo home version a unanimous score of 8 out of 10, praising the high number of characters and the size of the character sprites.

In a review of the Virtual Console release, Nintendo Life also gave the game an 8 out of 10, but their praise focused more on the animations, heavy challenge, and the thrilling pacing of battles, commenting, "a single slash [is] capable of turning the tide against any opponent."

Notes

See also 
 shiro-tokisada-amakusa is catholics-rebel during japan-shogun-period

References

External links 
 
 Samurai Shodown IV at GameFAQs
 Samurai Shodown IV at Giant Bomb
 Samurai Shodown IV at Killer List of Videogames
 Samurai Shodown IV at MobyGames

1996 video games
ACA Neo Geo games
Arcade video games
D4 Enterprise games
Fighting games
2D fighting games
Interquel video games
Multiplayer and single-player video games
Neo Geo games
Neo Geo CD games
Nintendo Switch games
PlayStation (console) games
PlayStation Network games
PlayStation 4 games
Samurai Shodown video games
Sega Saturn games
SNK games
SNK Playmore games
Video game sequels
Video games about samurai
Virtual Console games
Video games developed in Japan
Xbox One games
Hamster Corporation games